The surname Meyer is an English, Dutch, German, and Jewish surname. With its numerous variants (Myer, Meyr, Meier, Meijer, Mayer, Maier, Mayr, Mair etc., though not all instances of these names are necessarily cognate), it is the most common German surname. Its original meaning in Middle High German mei(g)er is "manager (of a lord's country estate)", derived from Latin maior domus, i.e. "headman of a household" (cf. mayor), later on also simply meaning "tenant" or "(free) farmer". It is therefore a rough equivalent of the English Steward which has also frequently been turned into a surname (incl. Stuart and other variants).

This appellation was also frequently used to form longer, more specific surnames, cf. Bergmair, Niedermeier etc. Furthermore, many German Jews adopted Meyer or a variant thereof as a surname when they assimilated to German culture in the 18th century, as it is close to the Hebrew first name Me'ir (מֵאִיר), i.e. "shining, enlightened".

Geographical distribution
In 2014, the surname Meyer was most often found (by percentage of the population) in Germany, Switzerland, Luxembourg and South Africa. The name ranked 6th in Germany and 8th in Switzerland.

Notable people

A–D
 Adolf Meyer (architect) (1881–1921), German architect
 Adolf Bernhard Meyer (1840–1911) German ornithologist
 Albert Meyer (politician) (1870–1953), Swiss politician
 Albert Gregory Meyer (1903–1965), Cardinal Archbishop of Chicago
 Alfred Meyer (1891–1945), German Nazi official
 Anita Meyer (born 1954), Dutch singer
 Anthony Meyer (1920–2004), British soldier, diplomat, and Conservative Party politician
 Antoine Meyer (1801–1857), Belgian mathematician
 Axel Meyer (born 1960), German evolutionary biologist
 Bernard F. Meyer (1898–1975), American Catholic missionary to China
 Bernard S. Meyer (1916–2005), New York judge
 Bernhard Meyer (1767–1836), German physician and naturalist
 Bertrand Meyer (born 1950), French computer scientist, designed the Eiffel programming language
 Bill Meyer (artist) (born 1942), Australian artist
 Birgit Meyer (born 1960), Dutch religious studies scholar
 Bob Meyer (born 1939), American baseball player
 Breckin Meyer (born 1974), American actor and producer
 Bunny Meyer (born 1985), American YouTube vlogger
 Cameron Meyer (born 1988), Australian professional racing cyclist
 Christian Meyer (disambiguation)
 Christoph Meyer (born 1975), German politician
 Christopher Meyer (born 1944), former British Ambassador to the U.S.
 Colleen Meyer (1939–2015), American politician and businesswoman
 Conrad Ferdinand Meyer (1825–1898), Swiss poet and writer
 Cord Meyer (1920–2001), American Central Intelligence Agency official, was married to Mary Pinchot Meyer
 Dakota Meyer (born 1988), U.S. Medal of Honor recipient
 Daniel P. Meyer (born 1965), a federal whistleblowing advocate
 Debbie Meyer (born 1952), U.S. Olympic swimmer
 Deon Meyer (born 1958), South African thriller novelist
 Dina Meyer (born 1968), U.S. actor
 Dirk Meyer, U.S. microprocessor designer
 Don Meyer (1944–2014), American basketball coach
 Drew Meyer (born 1981), American baseball player
 Dutch Meyer (1898–1982), American college sports coach

E–K
 Edgar Meyer (born 1960), U.S. double bassist
 Eduard Meyer (1855–1930), German historian
 Edward C. Meyer (1928–2020) U.S. Army general, former Army Chief of Staff
 Elana Meyer (born 1966), South African long-distance runner
 Eric Meyer (disambiguation), various people
 Ernest Meyer, (1865–1919), French equestrian
 Ernst Heinrich Friedrich Meyer (1791–1858), German botanist and historian of botany
 Ernst Hermann Meyer (1905–1988), German composer, pianist, and musicologist
 Eugene Meyer (financier) (1875–1959), American financier and newspaper publisher, former Federal Reserve Chairman
 Florence Meyer (1911–1962), American portrait photographer
 Frank Meyer (political philosopher) (1909–1972), U.S. conservative political philosopher
 Franz Sales Meyer (1849–1927), German painter and writer, known for A Handbook of Ornament
 Fred G. Meyer (1886–1978), U.S. retailer
 Frederick Brotherton Meyer (1847–1929), British Baptist preacher
 Georg Meyer (aviator) (1893–1926), German World War I flying ace
 George Meyer (born 1956) U.S. TV comedy writer
 George Meyer (soccer), American soccer coach
 George von Lengerke Meyer (1858–1918), U.S. Secretary of the Navy
 Greg Meyer (born 1955), American long-distance runner
 Gwendolyn Sontheim Meyer, Cargill heiress and equestrian
 Hajo Meyer (1924–2014), German-Dutch physicist and Jewish political activist
 Hannes Meyer (1889–1954), Swiss architect and director of the Bauhaus
 Hans Meyer (1858–1929), Austrian geographer and mountaineer
 Hans Horst Meyer (1853–1939), German physician and pharmacologist
 Heinrich August Wilhelm Meyer (1800–1873), German Protestant pastor and theologian
 Henry Meyer (disambiguation)
 Heyneke Meyer (born 1967), South African rugby union coach
 Hubert Meyer (1913–2012), German Waffen-SS officer
 Ilan Meyer (born 1956), American psychiatric epidemiologist
 Jack Meyer (born 1905), Educator and Cricketer
 Jacob O. Meyer, Directing Elder of the Assemblies of Yahweh
 Jean Jacques Meyer (1804–1877), French locomotive designer
 Jessica Kate Meyer, American actress and rabbi
 Joachim Meyer, German fencer, wrote Fundamental Descriptions of the Art of Fencing (1570)
 Joe-Fio Neenyann Meyer (born 1918), Ghanaian diplomat
 Johan Meyer (died 1901), German-born pioneer of the Queensland Gold Coast
 Johan Meyer (born 1993), South African rugby union player
 Johann Friedrich Meyer (1705–1765), German chemist
 Johannes Meyer (actor) (1884–1972), Danish film actor
 John Meyer (disambiguation)
 John C. Meyer (1919–1975), U.S. air force officer
 Joseph Meyer (publisher) (1796–1856), German industrialist and publisher
 Joseph Meyer (songwriter) (1894–1987), American songwriter
 Joseph A. Meyer (c. 1895 – 1970), American college sports coach
 Joyce Meyer (born 1943), U.S. Christian Charismatic speaker and writer
 Julius Lothar Meyer (1830–1895), German chemist
 Karl Meyer (activist), American pacifist, activist, Catholic worker and tax resister
 Karl E. Meyer, American journalist
 Karl Friedrich Meyer (1884–1974), Swiss-born American pathologist
 Katherine Meyer Graham (1917-2001), American publisher
 Katie Meyer (2000-2022), American soccer player
 Kenneth J. Meyer, American politician
 Kerstin Meyer (1928–2020), Swedish mezzo-soprano 
 Kirstine Meyer (1861–1941), Danish physicist
 Klaus Meyer (1937–2014) German football player
 Krzysztof Meyer (born 1943), Polish composer
 Kurt Meyer (Lucerne) (born 1944), Swiss politician
 Kurt Meyer (Panzermeyer) (1910–1961), German officer in the Waffen-SS

L–Z
 Laurenz Meyer (born 1948), German politician
 Lena Meyer-Landrut (born 1991), German singer
 Léon Meyer (1868–1948), French politician 
 Léone-Noëlle Meyer (born 1939), French businesswoman and philanthropist
 Lodewijk Meyer (1629–1681), Dutch physician, classical scholar, translator, lexicographer, and playwright
 Lucy Rider Meyer (1849–1922), American educator, physician, author, and social worker
 Lyndsay Meyer (born 1973), US-American ski mountaineer.
 Maile Meyer (born 1957), Native Hawaiian activist and entrepreneur
 Marany Meyer (born 1984), South African and New Zealand chess player
 Marc Eugene Meyer (1842–1925), U.S. businessman
 Mark Meyer (Wisconsin politician) (born 1963), U.S. politician 
 Marshall Meyer (1930–1993), U.S. rabbi and human rights activist
 Martin A. Meyer (1879–1923), American rabbi
 Mary Meyer (1917–1994), Dutch fencer
 Mary Eno Pinchot Meyer (1920–1964), American painter, romantic partner of President John F. Kennedy
 Maud Meyer Sierra Leonean Nigerian singer
 Max Meyer (disambiguation), several people
Michele Meyer, American politician
 Miriah Meyer, American computer scientist
 Nathan Meyer (born 1982), South African Paralympian
 Nicholas Meyer (born 1945), U.S. film-maker
 Paul Meyer (philologist) (1840–1917), French philologist
 Paul-André Meyer (1934–2003), French mathematician
 Philipp Meyer (born 1974) American author
 Philipp Meyer (politician) (1892–1962) German politician
 Ray Meyer (1913–2006), U.S. basketball coach
 Rémo Meyer (born 1980), Swiss football (soccer) player
 Robert B. Meyer (born 1943), American physicist
 Roelf Meyer (born 1947), former South African politician
 Russ Meyer (1922–2004), U.S. filmmaker
 Sabine Meyer (born 1959), German clarinettist
 Sarah E. Meyer, American animation artist
 Schuyler M. Meyer (1885–1970), New York politician
 Scott Meyer, American author, comedian, and artist
 Selma Meyer, Dutch pacifist, feminist and resistance fighter of Jewish origin
 Stephen C. Meyer (born 1958), U.S. philosopher of science and Intelligent Design proponent
 Stephenie Meyer (born 1973), American author best known as creator of the Twilight series
 Sven Meyer (figure skater), German figure skater
 Sven Meyer (footballer) (born 1970), German footballer
 Sydney Meyer (born 1995), Canadian actress
 Ted Meyer, rugby league footballer of the 1930s for New Zealand, and Northland
 Thérèse Meyer (born 1948), Swiss politician
 Thomas Meyer zu Schlochtern (born 1946), Dutch art curator
 Urban Meyer (born 1964), American college football coach
 Viktor Meyer (1848–1897), German chemist
 Wilhelm Meyer (physician) (1824–1895), Danish physician, discovered adenoids and invented adenoidectomy
 William Meyer (disambiguation)
 Wolfgang Meyer (1954–2019), German clarinettist and professor of clarinet 
 Yves Meyer (born 1939), French mathematician and scientist

See also 
 Meyer (disambiguation)
 Von Meyer, Myer, Meyr, Meier, Meijer, Meir, Mayer, Maier, Mayr, Mair
 Meyers, Myers
 Meyerson
 Meijer (surname)
 German family name etymology

References

German-language surnames
Hebrew-language surnames
Jewish surnames
Occupational surnames
Yiddish-language surnames